Styloleptus biustus is a species of beetle in the family Cerambycidae. It was described by John Lawrence LeConte in 1852.

References

Styloleptus
Beetles described in 1852